Brevik is an unincorporated community in Boy Lake Township, Cass County, Minnesota, United States, near Longville. It is along Cass County Road 39 near Liens Lane.

References

Unincorporated communities in Cass County, Minnesota
Unincorporated communities in Minnesota